The 1923 Tulane Green Wave football team was an American football team that represented Tulane University as a member of the Southern Conference (SoCon) during the 1923 college football season. In its eighth year under head coach Clark Shaughnessy, Tulane compiled a 6–3–1 record.

Schedule

References

Tulane
Tulane Green Wave football seasons
Tulane Green Wave football